Yangcheng Power Station is a coal-fired power station in Beiliu, Shanxi, China. It has an installed capacity of 3,300 MW. The plant was first commissioned in 1996. Construction on phase one of the plant began in 2001 and ended in 2007. The plant is the site of the world's two largest dry cooling towers.

See also 

 List of coal power stations
 List of largest power stations in the world
 List of power stations in China

References

Buildings and structures in Shanxi
Coal-fired power stations in China